Bishop Diego Evelino Hurtado Vélez (1638 in Santiago de Compostela, Spain - August 29, 1704 in Havana, Cuba) was the Bishop of Diocese of Santiago de Cuba (now the Archdiocese of Santiago de Cuba). He was known as Bishop Diego Evelino Hurtado de Compostela.

On June 4, 1685, he was appointed Bishop of Santiago de Cuba by Pope Innocent XI and was ordained bishop on August 29, 1704, by Cardinal Savo Millini, Apostolic Nuncio to Spain. He donated his orchard in Havana for the building of Convent of Belén (later used as the Colegio de Belén).  He died in Havana on August 29, 1704.

In 1687 he founded La Casa de Beneficencia y Maternidad de La Habana.

References

External links and additional sources
 (for Chronology of Bishops)  
 (for Chronology of Bishops) 
 Old Havana web article

1638 births
1704 deaths
17th-century Roman Catholic bishops in Cuba
Roman Catholic bishops of Santiago de Cuba